Oleg Vitalyevich Khlevniuk (born 7 July 1959 Vinnytsia, Ukrainian SSR) is a historian and a senior researcher at the State Archive of the Russian Federation in Moscow.  Much of his writing on Stalinist Soviet Union is based on newly released archival documents, including personal correspondence, drafts of Central Committee paperwork, new memoirs, and interviews with former functionaries and the families of Politburo members. Gleb Pavlovsky has characterized him as a "leading Russian historian of Stalinism." He also a corresponding fellow of Royal Historical Society.

Works
 The History of the Gulag, originally published in Russian.
 Cold Peace: Stalin and the Soviet Ruling Circle, 1945–1953
 The role of Gosplan in economic decision-making in the 1930s
 In Stalin's Shadow: The Career of "Sergo" Ordzhonikidze
 Master of the House: Stalin and His Inner Circle
 Stalin: New Biography of a Dictator

Award
Khlevniuk was awarded the Alexander Nove Prize (with Yoram Gorlizki) by the British Association for Slavonic and East European Studies 2004 for the book Cold Peace: Stalin and the Soviet Ruling Circle, 1945-1953.
In 2016, Pushkin House UK recognized his Stalin: New Biography of a Dictator as "the best Russian book in English translation" for that year.

References

Russian writers
Living people
Historians of communism
1959 births
Academic staff of the Higher School of Economics